Bartłomiej Piotr Wróblewski (born March 13, 1975 in Poznań) is a Polish politician, lecturer and lawyer. He is a member of the Sejm from Law and Justice

Education 
In 2000 Wróblewski graduated in law from Adam Mickiewicz University in Poznań. Later, he studied in the University of Bonn and the University of Bamberg. In 2009, he obtained his doctor's degree in law in his alma mater - Adam Mickiewicz University in Poznań. His academic specialization is: constitutional law, European law and human rights.

Writing 
He is an author of numerous papers and three books: “State Liability for Illegal Legislative Acts in Germany” (Nomos Verlagsgesellschaft, Baden-Baden 2005), “Non-contractual liability of the European Community for its normative acts” (Wydawnictwo Instytutu Zachodniego, Poznań 2005) and “State Liability for Legislative Acts in the Context of General State Liability Rules. The Development of the Concepts and Institutions until the mid-20th century” (Wydawnictwo C. H. Beck, Warsaw 2011).

Career 
He worked for Western Institute and the Chancellery of the President of the Republic of Poland. Now Wróblewski is an assistant professor in SWPS University of Social Sciences and Humanities (earlier he was a director of Law Institute).

In 2015 he was elected to the Sejm, getting 14 108 votes in 39 Poznań district with a number 11 ranking on the Law and Justice list. As a Member of Parliament Wróblewski is a chairman of Polish-German Parliamentary Group, Polish-Irish Parliamentary Group and a vice-chairman of Polish-English Parliamentary Group. He also presides over The Permanent Subcommittee of Election and Administrative Code Amendments. He filed a motion with the Constitutional Tribunal questioning whether Poland's laws against abortion covered abortion due to serious fetal defects, prompting criticism from pro-choice activists.

In March 2021 Wróblewski was nominated for the position of the Polish Ombudsman by Law and Justice. On April 15, 2021 the Polish Sejm chose him to become the Polish Ombudsman (240 MPs voted "for", 201 "against" and 11, including Wróblewski, "abstained"). However, on May 13, 2021, the Polish Senate rejected the nomination.

Alpinism 
Bartłomiej Wróblewski is also mountaineer. In 1998-2014 he reached Seven Summits.

References

External links 
 Biography on the official website
 Polish Sejm page for Bartłomiej Wróblewski

Law and Justice politicians
Members of the Sejm
Lawyers from Poznan
1975 births
Adam Mickiewicz University in Poznań alumni
University of Bonn alumni
University of Bamberg alumni
Summiters of the Seven Summits
20th-century Polish lawyers
21st-century Polish lawyers
21st-century Polish politicians
Academic staff of SWPS University
Polish mountain climbers
Living people
Politicians from Poznań